The Piegan (Blackfoot: Piikáni) are an Algonquian-speaking people from the North American Great Plains. They were the largest of three Blackfoot-speaking groups that made up the Blackfoot Confederacy; the Siksika and Kainai were the others. The Piegan dominated much of the northern Great Plains during the nineteenth century.

After their homelands were divided by the nations of Canada and the United States of America making boundaries between them, the Piegan people were forced to sign treaties with one of those two countries, settle in reservations on one side or the other of the border, and be enrolled in one of two government-like bodies sanctioned by North American nation-states.  These two successor groups are the Blackfeet Nation, a federally recognized tribe in northwestern Montana, U.S., and the Piikani Nation, a recognized "band" in Alberta, Canada.

Today many Piegan live with the Blackfeet Nation with tribal headquarters in Browning, Montana. There were 32,234 Blackfeet recorded in the 1990 United States Census. In 2010 the US Census reported 105,304 persons who identified as Blackfeet ("alone" or "in combination" with one or more races and/or tribes.)

Terminology 
The Piegan (also known as the Pikuni, Pikani, and Piikáni) are one of the three original tribes of the Blackfoot Confederacy (a "tribe" here refers to an ethnic or cultural group with a shared name and identity).  The Piegan are closely related to the Kainai Nation (also known as the "Blood Tribe"), and the Siksika Nation (also called the "Blackfoot Nation"); together they are sometimes collectively referred to as "the Blackfoot" or "the Blackfoot Confederacy". Ethnographic literature most commonly uses "Blackfoot people", and Canadian Blackfoot people use the singular Blackfoot.

The tribal governments and the US government use the term "Blackfeet", as in Blackfeet Nation, as used on their official tribe website. The term Siksika, derived from Siksikáíkoan (a Blackfoot person), may also be used as self-identification. In English, an individual may say, "I am Blackfoot" or "I am a member of the Blackfeet tribe."

Traditionally, Plains peoples were divided into "bands": groups of families who migrated together for hunting and defence. The bands of the Piegan, as given by Grinnell, are: Ahahpitape, Ahkaiyikokakiniks, Kiyis, Sikutsipmaiks, Sikopoksimaiks, Tsiniksistsoyiks, Kutaiimiks, Ipoksimaiks, Silkokitsimiks, Nitawyiks, Apikaiviks, Miahwahpitsiks, Nitakoskitsipupiks, Nitikskiks, Inuksiks, Miawkinaiyiks, Esksinaitupiks, Inuksikahkopwaiks, Kahmitaiks, Kutaisotsiman, Nitotsiksisstaniks, Motwainaiks, Mokumiks, and Motahtosiks. Hayden gives also Susksoyiks.

Relations and history

Before 1870s

In 2014, researchers reported on their sequencing of the DNA of a 12,500+-year-old infant skeleton in west-central Montana, found in close association with several Clovis culture artifacts. It showed strong affinities with all existing Native American populations.

There is preliminary evidence of human habitation in north central Montana that may date as far back as 5000 years. There was evidence that the people had made substantial use of buffalo jumps from as early as AD 300.

The Piegan people may be more recent arrivals in the area, as there is strong evidence that, beginning about 1730, their Algonquian-speaking ancestors migrated southwest from what today is Saskatchewan. Before that, they may have lived further east, as many Algonquian-speaking peoples have historically lived along the Atlantic Coast, and others around the Great Lakes.

Linguistic studies of the Blackfoot language in comparison to others in the Algonquian-language family indicate that the Blackfoot had long lived in an area west of the Great Lakes. Like others in this language family, the Blackfoot language is agglutinative.

The people practiced some agriculture and were partly nomadic. They moved westward after they adopted use of horses and guns, which gave them a larger range for bison hunting. They became part of the Plains Indians cultures in the early 19th century. According to tribal oral histories, humans lived near the Rocky Mountain Front for thousands of years before European contact.<ref>Grinnell, George Bird George Bird Grinnell Blackfoot Lodge Tales [https://archive.org/details/blackfootlodgeta11547gut "Blackfoot Lodge Tales"], (BiblioBazaar, 2006) </ref> The Blackfoot creation story is set near Glacier National Park in an area now known as the Badger-Two Medicine.

The introduction of the horse is placed at about 1730, when raids by the Shoshoni prompted the Piegan to obtain horses from the Kutenai, Salish and Nez Perce.  Early accounts of contact with European-descended people date to the late eighteenth century.  The fur trader James Gaddy and the Hudson's Bay Company explorer David Thompson, the first Whites recorded as seeing Bow River, camped with a group of Piegan during the 1787–1788 winter.

In 1858 the Piegan in the United States were estimated to number 3,700. Three years later, Hayden estimated the population at 2,520. The population was at times dramatically lower when the Blackfeet people suffered declines due to infectious disease epidemics. They had no natural immunity to Eurasian diseases, and the 1837 smallpox epidemic on the Plains killed 6,000 Blackfeet, as well as thousands more in other tribes. The Blackfoot also suffered from starvation because of disruption of food supplies and war. When the last buffalo hunt failed in 1882, that year became known as the starvation year. In 1900, there were an estimated 20,000 Blackfoot. In 1906 there were 2,072 under the Blackfeet Agency in Montana, and 493 under the Piegan band in Alberta, Canada. In the early 21st century, there are more than 35,000.  In the US 2010 census, 105,304 people identified as Piegan Blackfeet, 27,279 of them full-blooded, the remainder self-identified as being of more than one race or, in some cases, with ancestry from more than one tribe, but they primarily identified as Blackfeet.

The Blackfeet had controlled large portions of Alberta and Montana. Today the Blackfeet Reservation in Montana is the size of Delaware, and the three Blackfoot reserves in Alberta have a much smaller area.

The Blackfeet hold belief "in a sacred force that permeates all things, represented symbolically by the sun whose light sustains all things".

The Blackfeet have "manly-hearted women". These were recorded as acting in many of the social roles of men.  This includes a willingness to sing alone, usually considered "immodest", and using a men's singing style.

After 1870s

Piegan
Earl Old Person (1929–2021 ), former Chief of the Blackfeet Tribe; added to the Montana Indian Hall of Fame in 2007
Helen Piotopowaka Clarke (1846–1923), actress, educator, and bureaucrat ; was one of the first women elected to public office in Montana
James Welch (1940–2003), author and poet. While most of his published works were novels, he also wrote the non-fiction historical account, Killing Custer: The Battle of Little Bighorn and the Fate of the Plains Indians. He was one of the participants in the PBS American Experience documentary, Last Stand at Little Bighorn. His award-winning novel Fools Crow is based on the Blackfeet tribe and its culture.
John Two Guns White Calf (1872–1934) was a chief who became famous while promoting the Glacier National Park for the Great Northern Railway.
Stephen Graham Jones (1972- ), author, won a National Endowment for the Arts Fellowship and the Independent Publisher Book Award for Multicultural Fiction, and other awards. At public readings he has said that his short story "Bestiary" is not fiction.

Books about the Blackfeet
 George Bird Grinnell (1849–1938), European-American author and ethnologist; wrote accounts of the Blackfeet Nation during his travels and research as a conservationist; editor of Forest and Stream James Willard Schultz, or Apikuni (1859–1947), author, explorer, Glacier National Park guide, fur trader and historian of the Blackfeet Indians. He wrote and published 37 fiction and non-fiction books dealing with the Blackfeet, Kootenai, and Flathead Indians. His works received critical literary acclaim.

 See also 
 Marias massacre

References

Bibliography
Dempsey, Hugh A. and Lindsay Moir. Bibliography of the Blackfoot, (Native American Bibliography Series, No. 13) Metuchen, NJ: The Scarecrow Press, 1989, 
Ewers, John C. The Blackfeet: Raiders on the Northwestern Plains, Norman: University of Oklahoma Press, 1958 (and later reprints). 
Johnson, Bryan R. The Blackfeet: An Annotated Bibliography'', New York: Garland Publishing, 1988.

External links
Official Site of the Blackfoot Nation
Blackfoot – English Dictionary
Blackfoot Culture and History Links
Blackfeet Indian History
Blackfeet Indian Reservation
Blackfeet Indian Stories by George Bird Grinnell
Constitution and By-Laws For the Blackfeet Tribe Of The Blackfeet Indian Reservation of Montana
Magee Photograph Collection – nearly 1,000 digitized photographic negatives depicting life on the Blackfeet Nation.
Blackfoot Digital Library

Native American tribes in Montana
 
Plains tribes
Federally recognized tribes in the United States